James R. West was professor of trumpet at the Louisiana State University School of Music in Baton Rouge, Louisiana from 1978 to 2013. Well known as an educator and active in the International Trumpet Guild, he is a writer for the International Trumpet Guild Journal and is the former principal trumpet of the Baton Rouge Symphony Orchestra. He is the Louisiana state chairperson of the National Association of College Wind and Percussion Instructors, and was a student of Vincent Cichowicz, who played second trumpet with the Chicago Symphony Orchestra.

American trumpeters
American male trumpeters
Living people
Year of birth missing (living people)
21st-century trumpeters
21st-century American male musicians